The following nations currently operate (or formerly owned) Mi-8 and Mi-17 helicopters in civil or military roles:

Military operators

Afghanistan
Afghan Air Force

Algeria
Algerian Air Force

Angola
Angolan Air Defence Force

Argentina
Argentine Air Force

Armenia
Armenian Air Force

Azerbaijan
Azerbaijan Air Force

Bangladesh

Bangladesh Air Force
Bangladesh Army
Border Guards Bangladesh

Belarus
Belarus Air Force

Bhutan
Royal Bhutan Army

Bosnia and Herzegovina
Bosnia and Herzegovina Air Force

Bulgaria
Bulgarian Air Force

Burkina Faso
Burkina Faso Air Force

Cambodia
Royal Cambodian Air Force

Cameroon
Cameroon Air Force

Chad
Chad Air Force

China
People's Liberation Air Force
People's Liberation Army

Colombia
Colombian National Army Aviation

Republic of the Congo
Congolese Air Force

Democratic Republic of the Congo
Congo Democratic Air Force

Croatia
Croatian Air Force

Cuba
Cuban Air Force

Czech Republic
Czech Air Force

Djibouti
Djibouti Air Force

Ecuador
Ecuadorian Army

Egypt
Egyptian Air Force

Equatorial Guinea
Equatorial Guinea Air Force

Eritrea
Eritrean Air Force

Ethiopia
Ethiopian Air Force

Georgia

Georgian Air Force
Georgian Land Forces

Ghana

Ghana Air Force

Guinea
Military of Guinea

India
Indian Air Force

Indonesia
Indonesian Army

Iran
 Islamic Republic of Iran Navy

Iraq
Iraqi Army

Kazakhstan
Kazakh Air Defence Force

Kenya
Kenya Air Force

Kyrgyzstan
Kyrgyzstan Air Force

Laos
Laotian Air Force

Libya
Libyan Air Force

Lithuania
Lithuanian Air Force

Mali
Malian Air Force

Mexico
Mexican Air Force
Mexican Navy

Moldova
Moldovan Air Force
Transnistria Air Force 1 active on Tiraspol Airport, 9 stored

Mongolia
Mongolian Air Force

Mozambique
Military of Mozambique

Myanmar
Myanmar Air Force

Namibia
Namibian Air Force

Nepal
Nepalese Army Air Service

Nicaragua
Nicaraguan Air Force

Niger
Niger Air Force

Nigeria
Nigerian Air Force

North Korea
North Korean Air Force

North Macedonia
North Macedonia Air Force

Pakistan
Pakistan Air Force
Pakistan Army

Peru
Peruvian Air Force
Peruvian Army
Peruvian Navy

Poland
Polish Air Force
Polish Land Forces
Polish Navy

Russia
Russian Air Force
Russian Naval Aviation

Rwanda
Rwandan Defence Forces

Serbia
Serbian Air Force

Senegal
Senegalese Air Force

Sierra Leone
Sierra Leone Armed Forces

Slovakia
Slovak Air Force

South Sudan
Sudan People's Liberation Army

Sri Lanka
Sri Lanka Air Force
Sri Lanka Navy

Sudan
Sudanese Air Force

Syria
Syrian Air Force

Tajikistan
Tajikistan Air Force

Turkmenistan
Turkmen Air Force
Ministry of Health

Thailand
Royal Thai Army

Uganda
Ugandan Air Force

Ukraine
Ukrainian Ground Forces

United States
 US Army Test and Evaluation Command

Uzbekistan
Uzbekistan Air and Air Defence Forces

Venezuela
Venezuelan Air Force
Venezuelan Army
Venezuelan Navy

Vietnam
Vietnam People's Air Force

Yemen
Yemeni Air Force

Zambia
Zambia Air Force

Zimbabwe
Air Force of Zimbabwe

Para-military, law enforcement and other government operators

Bangladesh
Border Guards Bangladesh

Equatorial Guinea
Government of Equatorial Guinea

Georgia
Ministry of Internal Affairs of Georgia

Indonesia
National Disaster Management Authority

North Macedonia
 Ministry of Internal Affairs

Malaysia
Malaysian Fire and Rescue Department

Pakistan
Government of Khyber Pakhtunkhwa

Poland
Polish Police

Romania
Ministry of Internal Affairs (Romania) 3 MI 17 and 2 MI-8

Russia
Border Service of Russia 
Internal Troops of Russia

Republic of Korea 
 National Police Agency (South Korea)

Turkey
 Turkish Gendarmerie

Civil operators

Cuba
 Aerogaviota

India
 Pawan Hans Helicopters

Mongolia
 Mongolian Airlines

Nepal
 Shree Airlines

North Korea
Air Koryo

Russia
 Altai Airlines

  Barkol Aviation
 Kazan Air Enterprise
 UTAir
 Vladivostok Air
 Aeroflot Airline

Slovakia
 Air Transport Europe

Turkmenistan
 Turkmenistan Airlines

United States
 Vertol Systems

Vietnam 

 Vietnam Helicopter Corporation
 Northern Vietnam Helicopter Company
 Central Vietnam Helicopter Company
 Southern Vietnam Helicopter Company

Former operators

Canada
Royal Canadian Air Force
427 Special Operations Aviation Squadron operated four leased Russian Mil Mi-17-V5 designated as CH-178. Helicopters had assigned serial numbers 178404-178407.

Czechoslovakia
Czechoslovakian Air Force

East Germany
East German Air Force
East German Navy

Finland
Finnish Army
Finnish Border Guard

Germany
German Air Force
German Navy

Guinea-Bissau
Military of Guinea-Bissau

Japan
Aum Shinrikyo(Cult)
 Serial No. 4K-15214. Imported from Azerbaijan in 1994 to spray chemical agents, but not given licenses and flown in Japan. In 2001, exported to Djibouti as J2-MAW.

Laos
Lao Airlines

Latvia
Latvian Air Force

Madagascar
Malagasy Air Force

North Yemen
Yemen Arab Republic Air Force

Romania
Romanian Air Force

Serbia and Montenegro
Serbia and Montenegro Air Force

South Yemen
People's Democratic Republic of Yemen Air Force

Soviet Union
Soviet Air Force
 Soviet Army Aviation
Soviet Naval Aviation
 Aeroflot

Republika Srpska
Srpska Air Force

Somalia
Somali Air Corps

FR Yugoslavia
Yugoslav Air Force
Yugoslav Navy

United Kingdom
 Empire Test Pilots' School

Yemen
Yemen Air Force

See also 

 Mil Mi-8
 Mil Mi-17

References

Citations

Bibliography

Mi-8/17
Lists of military units and formations by aircraft
Russian and Soviet military-related lists